Paul Henry Guzzi (born June 17, 1942) is an American businessman and former Massachusetts Secretary of the Commonwealth.
He was president and chief executive officer of the Greater Boston Chamber of Commerce for 19 years.

Biography 

Paul Guzzi graduated from Harvard University with a degree in government.

Guzzi was a member of the Massachusetts House of Representatives from 1971 to 1974.
In the 1974 general election Guzzi defeated Republican state Senator John M. Quinlan to be elected Secretary of the Commonwealth. Guzzi served as Secretary from 1975 to 1978.  In 1978, Guzzi ran for the United States Senate, he was defeated in the Democratic primary by Paul Tsongas.
He then served as chief of staff to Massachusetts Governor Ed King.
In 1980 Guzzi was named interim chancellor of the newly formed Massachusetts Board of Regents for Public Higher Education.

Guzzi was a senior vice president of Wang Laboratories from 1981 to 1991.
He was a vice president at Data General from 1991 to 1993.

Guzzi served as president and CEO of the Greater Boston Chamber of Commerce from 1996 to 2015.
He has served as a director of several corporations.
Guzzi is also a trustee of the Citi Performing Arts Center and a director of The Boston Foundation.
Guzzi is co-host of This Week in Business on the New England Cable News network.

References

External links 
Paul Guzzi bio at the Greater Boston Chamber of Commerce

1942 births
Living people
Harvard College alumni
Democratic Party members of the Massachusetts House of Representatives
Politicians from Newton, Massachusetts
Secretaries of the Commonwealth of Massachusetts
20th-century American businesspeople